Chauvin may refer to:

Places 

 Chauvin, Alberta, Canada, a village
 Chauvin, Louisiana, U.S., a town in the Bayou Chauvin
 Chauvin, Michigan, U.S.

Others
Chauvin (surname)

See also 
Chauvinism